Jean de Gaulle (born 13 June 1953) is a French politician.

He is the son of Philippe de Gaulle and Henriette de Montalembert, and grandson of Charles de Gaulle. He was the Mayor of Thenezay from 24 March 1989 to 18 June 1995. He was prosecuted for concealing embezzlement and concealment of misappropriation of public funds.

He was a deputy of the National Assembly for the Deux-Sèvres department until his retirement at the 2007 elections.

References 

Politicians from Bourg-en-Bresse
1953 births
Living people
Jean de Gaulle
Union for a Popular Movement politicians
Saint-Jean de Passy alumni
Deputies of the 12th National Assembly of the French Fifth Republic
Members of Parliament for Paris